Denovali Records is an independent record label founded in 2005. The program of Denovali covers ambient, electronica, experimental, drone, jazz, modern composition & sound art. Since 2007 Denovali curates and organizes international music festivals. In line with the start of the label activities in 2005 Denovali opened an online record store also featuring records from other record labels.

Current artists (selection)
Ah! Kosmos
Bersarin Quartett
Birds Of Passage
Blackfilm
Blueneck
Celeste
Contemporary Noise Sextet
Dictaphone
Elektro Guzzi
Ensemble Economique
Field Rotation
Floex
Franz Kirmann
Fogh Depot
Greg Haines
Hidden Orchestra
John Lemke
Kuba Kapsa
Lento
Les Fragments De La Nuit
Mario Diaz De Leon
Matthew Collings
Michael Vallera
Moon Zero
Multicast Dynamics
N
Nadia Struiwigh
Never Sol
Omega Massif
Oneirogen
Origamibiro
Orson Hentschel
Paco Sala
Pan & Me
Philipp Rumsch
Piano Interrupted
Petrels
Prairie
Ricardo Donoso
Robin Schlochtermeier
Saffronkeira
Sankt Otten
Second Moon Of Winter
Selaxon Lutberg
Subheim
Switchblade
Talvihorros
Terminal Sound System
The Alvaret Ensemble
The Dale Cooper Quartet
The Eye Of Time
The Kilimanjaro Darkjazz Ensemble
The Mount Fuji Doomjazz Corporation
The Pirate Ship Quintet
The Samuel Jackson 5
Thomas Köner
Waelder

Past artists (selection)
A Dead Forest Index
Kodiak
Mouse on the Keys

References

External links
 Official website

German independent record labels
Electronic music record labels
Ambient music record labels
Experimental music record labels